Jordan Bailon (born March 24, 2000) is an American soccer player who plays as a defender for New York Red Bulls II in the United Soccer League.

Career
Baillon appeared for United Soccer League side New York Red Bulls II during their 2018 season from the New York Red Bulls academy.

Bailon has committed to playing college soccer at Dartmouth College later in 2018.

References

2000 births
Living people
American soccer players
New York Red Bulls II players
Association football defenders
Soccer players from New Jersey
USL Championship players
Sportspeople from Morris County, New Jersey
People from Morristown, New Jersey